Oscar Cahén (sometimes spelled Oscar Cahen) (February 8, 1916 – November 26, 1956) was a Canadian painter and illustrator. Cahén is best known as a member of Painters Eleven, a group of abstract artists active in Toronto from 1953-1960, and for his fifteen years of work as an illustrator of Canadian magazines.

Early Years
Cahén was born in Copenhagen, Denmark. His parents were Eugenie Caroline Auguste Stamm and Fritz Max Cahén, a well known anti-Nazi activist. Cahén was trained in Europe at the Dresden Academy of Fine Arts from March 1932 to August 1933 in the academy studio of Max Frey. In 1938 he taught in Prague at the Rotter-Schule für Werbegrafik before escaping the Nazi occupation by traveling to England in 1939. He worked as an editorial illustrator during the war and began painting, moving to abstract works that were described at the time as expressing modern life. Considered German by the British, he was interned in Britain and sent to Canada in 1940 as an enemy alien with other Europeans of Jewish descent. His artistic contacts in Canada secured his release in October 1942, and he worked in Montréal at advertising firm Rapid, Grip and Batten before moving to Toronto in late 1944 to become art editor for Magazine Digest. Cahén subsequently worked as a freelance illustrator for magazines such as Maclean's, Chatelaine and New Liberty. As an illustrator, Cahén won five medals and six awards of merit from the Toronto Art Directors Club, 1949–1957.

Painters Eleven
In the late 1940s he met Walter Yarwood, Harold Town and others involved in avant-garde art in Toronto, and Cahén was included in the Abstracts at Home display held in 1953 at the Robert Simpson Company, Toronto. He formed Painters Eleven with ten other abstract painters (most of whom had also been in the Abstracts At Home event) soon after. In Canada's conservative art world their early exhibitions were met with disdain. Nevertheless, Painters Eleven attracted U.S. exposure with a successful exhibition, Twentieth Annual Exhibition of American Abstract Artists with 'Painters Eleven' of Canada in 1956, with the American Abstract Artists at the Riverside Museum in New York, and were praised by the influential critic Clement Greenberg on a visit he paid to the group in Toronto in 1957. In the Canadian press, the group's most ardent supporter was art critic Robert Fulford. Cahén was killed in a car accident in Oakville, Ontario in 1956 and the group formally disbanded in 1960.

Painting Technique and Colour Sense
Cahén had an unusual ability to move from one medium to another and from representational to abstract idioms with equal success. Perhaps his most original contribution was a technique he called “monoetching,” which involved applying a thin layer of wax to an illustration board which he then scratched through with a needle. He would then apply a water-based pigment overtop which would seep through the scratches into the exposed board beneath. However, more than any other of his talents, Cahén is probably best remembered today for his colour sense, as his best known works often combined orange and pink along with reds, blues and greens.

Awards
 1975 Royal Canadian Academy of Arts Medal.

References

Bibliography 
Broad, Graham. "Art Shock in Toronto: Painters Eleven, The Shock of the New." The Beaver, Canada’s History Magazine Vol. 84:1 (2004)
Buchanan, Donald W. "An Illustrator Speaks His Mind: An Interview with Oscar Cahén." Canadian Art 8, no. 1 (Autumn 1950): 2-8.
Burnett, David G. and Marilyn Schiff. Contemporary Canadian Art. Toronto: Art Gallery of Ontario, 1983. 
Dault, Gary Michael. "Oscar Cahén: In Search of Lost Fame." Border Crossings Vol. 23, No. 3 (2004): 61-63.
Grove, Jaleen. Oscar Cahén: Life & Work. Toronto: Art Canada Institute. Retrieved March 3, 2018. 978-1-4871-0063-6
Grove, Jaleen. Oscar Cahén: Canada's Groundbreaking Illustrator. Illustration House, 2011, 2012, 2013. 
Nasgaard, Roald. Abstract Painting in Canada. Vancouver: Douglas & McIntyre, 2008. 
Nickel, Karl. Oscar Cahén: First American Retrospective Exhibition. Sarasota: Ringling Museum of Art, 1968.

 Spalding, Jeffrey. Oscar Cahén, Past as Prologue. Halifax: Art Gallery of Nova Scotia, 2007.

External links
 Official site
 Oscar Cahén (Profile), The Canadian Encyclopedia

Canadian illustrators
20th-century Canadian painters
Canadian male painters
1916 births
1956 deaths
Road incident deaths in Canada
Danish emigrants to Canada
Accidental deaths in Ontario
20th-century Canadian male artists
Canadian abstract artists